Nicolaas ("Moos") Linneman (June 11, 1931 – October 31, 2020) was a boxer from the Netherlands, who competed at two consecutive Summer Olympics for his native country. First in London (1948), then four years later in Helsinki, where he was stopped in the quarterfinals of the Men's Welterweight (-67 kg) division by Günther Heidemann of Germany. He was born in Amsterdam, North Holland.

References
Dutch Olympic Committee
Moos Linneman's obituary 

1931 births
2020 deaths
Welterweight boxers
Olympic boxers of the Netherlands
Boxers at the 1948 Summer Olympics
Boxers at the 1952 Summer Olympics
Boxers from Amsterdam
Dutch male boxers